The UEFA Futsal Champions League is an annual futsal competition for European club teams organized by UEFA. It was founded as the UEFA Futsal Cup in 2001 and replaced the Futsal European Clubs Championship, an unofficial competition held since 1984. The final of the first edition was disputed as a single game in Lisbon, while the following four editions were decided over two legs. Since 2006–07, the winner is decided through a final four tournament.

In 2018, the tournament was rebranded as UEFA Futsal Champions League.

Winners

Records and statistics

Performance by team

Performance by country 

Note: There were no third place playoff matches prior the 2006–07 season and in the 2020–21 edition.

Top scorers

Top scorers by season

Source:

Final tournament top scorers

All-time top scorers

Source:

Players records

Broadcasters 
For the final four round, will be live streamed by UEFA TV in the unsold markets with highlights available in all territories.

2021-2024 season

Europe

Outside Europe

See also
Intercontinental Futsal Cup
European Universities Futsal Championships

References

External links

 Official website
 European Universities Futsal Championships
 6th European Women's Futsal Tournament
 European Women's Futsal Tournament + UEFA Women's Futsal Champions League

 
Futsal Champions League
International club futsal competitions
Futsal competitions in Europe
Recurring sporting events established in 2001
2001 establishments in Europe
Multi-national professional sports leagues